Parque is one of the forty subbarrios of Santurce, San Juan, Puerto Rico. It is located between Condado and Ocean Park.

Demographics
In 2000, Parque had a population of 3,251.

In 2010, Parque had a population of 2,871 and a population density of 23,925 persons per square mile.

Description
In the east, the boundary to Ocean Park is formed by Calle María Mozco (northern part) and Calle Santa Ana. In the west, the boundary to Condado is marked by De Diego Avenue and its straight extension towards the Atlantic coast. The boundary runs along but does not include Calle Loíza. In the north is the coast of the Atlantic Ocean.

See also
 
 List of communities in Puerto Rico

References

Santurce, San Juan, Puerto Rico
Municipality of San Juan